"The Interview" was the twenty-fifth and final episode of the fourth season of the TV series M*A*S*H. The 97th episode overall, it first aired in the United States on February 24, 1976.

Plot synopsis
A news correspondent (Clete Roberts) visits the 4077th to get their feelings about the war.

Production
The episode was broadcast in black and white and was the final episode for series developer Larry Gelbart. Loretta Swit does not appear. Recently a full color version of this episode has appeared on Hulu. The opening comment "The following is in black and white", remains intact, however. As of May 2019, the episode has been restored to black and white on Hulu.

Reception

The episode won the Humanitas Prize for 30 Minute Network or Syndicated Television for 1976.

In 1997, TV Guide ranked this episode #80 on its list of the 100 Greatest Episodes.

References

External links
 

M*A*S*H (season 4) episodes
1976 American television episodes
Black-and-white television episodes